Mamonde (Hangul: 마몽드) is a South Korean skincare and cosmetics brand owned by Amore Pacific.

Mamonde was launched by Amore Pacific in 1991. The brand name comes from Ma Monde which is a combination of the words My and World in French.

History 
Amore Pacific, one of the largest cosmetics companies in South Korea, created Mamonde in 1991.

In 2005, Mamonde was launched in China. By July 2013, its products are sold at 900 department stores and over 2,500 cosmetics stores in 270 cities in China.

On July 12, 2013, Mamonde opened its flagship store in Myeong-dong. In the same month, Mamonde was launched in Thailand.

Mamonde expanded in the west in 2015 and opened its first store in the United States. By 2017, it has stores in the U.S. and in Canada. The brand also opened its first store in Malaysia in 2016 and opened its first in Singapore in 2017.

Products
Mamonde has a wide range of makeup and skin care products. They use flowers such as camellia, lotus and jasmine as ingredients for their products. Their products include the Age control ultra repair cream, Advanced Self Control Massage Cream, Rose Water Toner, Soft Bloom Makeup Base and the Total Solution Moisture Cream.

 Red Energy Recovery Serum is a serum with Blossoming Energy™ as its core ingredient.
 Rose Water Toner contains 90.97% rose water as a toner for soothing and moisturizing the skin.
 Ceramide Intense Cream is a moisturizing barrier cream that contains a moisturizing effect ingredient of Mugunghwa.
 Creamy Tint Color Balm is a lip pencil that contains lipstick, tint, and lip balm functions at the same time.

Spokespersons and models
Lee young ae: 1991

Han ga in: 2006

In 2011, actress Han Ji-min was chosen as the new endorser of Mamonde. In the same year, Super Junior's Choi Siwon became Mamonde's first male endorser and the brand has since been endorsed by other notable celebrities such as Girls' Generation's Kwon Yuri and actress Park Shin-hye alongside SNH48 and THE9 member, Kiki Xu Jiaqi.

References

External links
 Mamonde official website
 Mamonde China official website

Amorepacific brands